Great Colinet Island is an island of St. Mary's Bay, Newfoundland and Labrador, Canada. Both this island and Little Colinet Island makeup the Colinet Islands.

Great Colinet Island is approximately 8 km long and 2 km wide with the highest point called Topsails at approximately 305 m. The island first appeared on English maps in 1669 as Collinet and in 1671 as Colonet Isle. Then in 1698 it was labeled Collemot on French maps.

Two permanent settlements were recorded on the island Mosquito and Mother IXX which was originally called Regina. In 1951 it was proclamined Reginaville.

External links 
 Colinet Islands

Islands of Newfoundland and Labrador